Steven B. Jepson (born 1960)is an American opera singer, a baritone. In addition to his work in opera he has appeared in musical theater and film. He is best known for his interpretation of Escamillo in Carmen, a role he has played with several companies in the United States and Europe.  He was nominated by both Creative Loafing magazine and the Metrolina Theatre Association as best actor for his portrayal of Emile De Becque in South Pacific.  He also has performed as principal singer for Norwegian Cruise Line on board the Norwegian Sky.

Jepson is also a teacher, coach and clinician in acting as well as singing.

References

External links
 Personal website

1960 births
Living people
American operatic baritones
20th-century American male opera singers
21st-century American male opera singers
Musicians from Iowa City, Iowa
Singers from Iowa